Africa Screams is a 1949 American adventure comedy film starring Abbott and Costello and directed by Charles Barton that parodies the safari genre. The title is a play on the title of the 1930 documentary Africa Speaks! The supporting cast features Clyde Beatty, Frank Buck, Hillary Brooke, Max Baer, Buddy Baer, Shemp Howard and Joe Besser. The film entered the public domain in 1977.

Plot
Diana Emerson visits the book section of Klopper's department store seeking the book Dark Safari by the famed explorer Cuddleford. She tells the clerk, Buzz Johnson, that she will pay $2,500 for a map that is inside the book. Buzz's friend and coworker Stanley Livington, an armchair explorer, has read the book and says that he is familiar with a map within it. Buzz brings Stanley to Diana's home to draw the map, but when he overhears Diana offer Clyde Beatty $20,000 to lead an expedition to capture a legendary giant ape, Buzz realizes that the map is worth considerably more. Buzz negotiates for more money and for he and Stanley to join the safari.

They travel to the Congo with Diana's team of explorers, including Harry "Boots" Wilson, Grappler McCoy and Gunner, a nearsighted professional hunter. When he learns that the expedition's true goal is not the giant ape but a fortune in diamonds, Buzz renegotiates their deal. However, the map in the book with which Stanley is familiar is one that he had drawn to plot the route to his job at Klopper's. However, Stanley's memory of the book's details bring the party to the region Diana in which is interested. There they run across famed animal collector Frank Buck.

A cannibal tribe sets a trail of diamonds to lure and capture Buzz and Stanley. The boys are rescued by a grateful gorilla whom Stanley had inadvertently rescued from one of Frank Buck's traps. The cannibal chief offers Diana diamonds in exchange for Stanley, but Stanley flees while Buzz recovers the diamonds and hides them. While pursuing Stanley, the expeditionary team and the cannibals are frightened away by the giant ape whose existence had been dismissed as myth. The friendly gorilla recovers the diamonds before Buzz can do so. Distraught over the loss of his treasure, Buzz abandons Stanley in the jungle.

Some time later, back in the United States, Stanley appears prosperous and owns his own skyscraper, and Buzz works as the elevator operator. Stanley's partner is the gorilla who had recovered the diamonds.

Cast
 Bud Abbott as Buzz Johnson
 Lou Costello as Stanley Livington
 Clyde Beatty as himself
 Frank Buck as himself
 Max Baer as Grappler McCoy
 Buddy Baer as Boots Wilson
 Hillary Brooke as Diana Emerson
 Shemp Howard as Gunner
 Joe Besser as Harry
 Burton Wenland as Bobo
 Charles Gemora as The Ape

Production and history
Africa Screams was filmed from November 10 through December 22, 1948 at the Nassour Studios in Los Angeles. The film was produced by Edward Nassour and A&P heir Huntington Hartford. It was the second of Abbott and Costello's independently financed productions while they were under contract to Universal. It was released by United Artists.

Abbott and Costello surrounded themselves with family and friends, and the picture ran over budget. Nassour was so distressed that a running joke on the set was that the film should be retitled "Nassour Screams".

Clyde Beatty provided his own animals for the film. The affectionate gorilla pursuing Costello was originally scripted as a female. However, the Breen Office censors who enforced the Motion Picture Production Code demanded that the gorilla's gender be changed to avoid suggestions of bestiality.

Africa Screams was Abbott and Costello's first production with Hillary Brooke and Joe Besser, both of whom would later become part of the ensemble cast of the television series The Abbott and Costello Show. The film also marked the only time that Besser and Shemp Howard appeared together in a film; Besser would replace Howard as one of the Three Stooges following Howard's death in 1955.

The film was purchased in 1953 by Robert Haggiag, an independent distributor in New York. Haggiag failed to renew the copyright because he had lost interest in the film, and it fell into the public domain in 1977. Author and film historian Bob Furmanek contacted Haggiag in the late 1980s and obtained the original nitrate stock. Most of the original camera negative had decomposed, but the nitrate fine grain was still serviceable and Furmanek transferred it to 35mm for preservation.

Home media
This film is in the public domain and has been released multiple times on VHS and DVD by several companies. Bob Furmanek launched a Kickstarter project to raise funds to restore the film on Blu-ray on December 1, 2019 and reached his original $7,500 goal in about 29 hours. The Blu-ray version was released in June 2020.

Historical references

The main character's name of Stanley Livington suggests the surnames of British explorers Henry Morton Stanley and David Livingstone, who had a famous meeting in 1871. It is not known whether the change from Livingstone to Livington is the result of a typographical error or a deliberate change.

See also
 Africa Squeaks

References

External links

 
 
 
 
 

1949 films
American black-and-white films
Abbott and Costello films
Films set in Africa
United Artists films
1940s English-language films
Films directed by Charles Barton
Films scored by Walter Schumann
1940s adventure comedy films
Articles containing video clips
American adventure comedy films
1949 comedy films
1940s American films